The Far Side of Paradise is a biography of F. Scott Fitzgerald by Arthur Mizener. Published in 1951 by Houghton Mifflin in the US and Eyre & Spottiswoode in the UK, it was the first published biography of Fitzgerald and is credited with renewing public interest in its subject. It dealt frankly with Scott's alcoholism and his wife Zelda's schizophrenia.

Edmund Wilson, literary critic and close friend of the Fitzgeralds, later commented that the book's anecdotes distorted Scott and Zelda's relationship and personalities for the worse.

References

1951 non-fiction books
American biographies
Houghton Mifflin books
Eyre & Spottiswoode books
F. Scott Fitzgerald